A cruise director is a high-ranking or senior officer of a cruise ship with responsibility for all onboard hospitality, entertainment and social events, who acts as the public face of the company. The cruise director reports to the hotel director, has a deputy or assistant cruise director, and is supported by a team of entertainment staff.

Responsibilities of a cruise director may include:
Scheduling of entertainment, activities and social events
Officer in charge of entertainment staff
Public announcements
Conducting and supervising safety briefings or drills for both passengers and crew.

Portrayals on television
As a highly visible member of staff on a cruise ship, many television actors have portrayed the role of a cruise director. Notable examples are Lauren Tewes as Julie McCoy in The Love Boat and Gale Storm as Susanna Pomeroy in The Gale Storm Show.

References

Marine occupations